William Cayley may refer to:
William Cayley (Canadian politician), Canadian politician and lawyer
William Cayley (MP) (died 1768), MP for Dover
Sir William Cayley, 1st Baronet (1610–1681) of the Cayley baronets
Sir William Cayley, 2nd Baronet (1635–c. 1708) of the Cayley baronets
William Cayley (Royal Navy officer) (1742–1801)

See also

Cayley (disambiguation)